Bronk is an American drama series created by Carroll O'Connor, who was also the executive producer, and starring Jack Palance as Detective Lieutenant Alex Bronkov. The series is set in the fictional Ocean City, California.

For one season, the series aired Sundays at 10:00 pm (EST) from September 21, 1975 to March 28, 1976 on CBS.

Cast
Jack Palance as Lt. Alex Bronkov
Joseph Mascolo as Mayor Pete Santori
Henry Beckman as Harry Mark
Tony King as Sgt. John Webber
Dina Ousley as Ellen Bronkov

Episodes

Home media
On June 4, 2019, Warner Bros. released Bronk- The Complete Series on DVD via their Warner Archive Collection.  This is a manufacture-on-demand (MOD) release, available through Warner's online store and Amazon.com.

References

External links

1975 American television series debuts
1976 American television series endings
1970s American crime drama television series
Television series by MGM Television
English-language television shows
Television shows set in California
American detective television series
CBS original programming